Peter Bryan Price (born 17 May 1944) is a retired English Anglican bishop. He was the Bishop of Bath and Wells in the Church of England from 2001 to 30 June 2013. He sat in the House of Lords as one of the Lords Spiritual from 2008 until his retirement. Currently he chairs the board of trustees for the NGO Conciliation Resources.

Price attended Oak Hill Theological College. He was ordained a deacon in 1974 and a priest in 1975. He has been chancellor of Southwark Cathedral, the area Bishop of Kingston, the chairman of the Southwark Diocesan Board of Mission and the general secretary of the United Society for the Propagation of the Gospel (USPG). He was consecrated a bishop on 2 December 1997 at by George Carey, Archbishop of Canterbury. He broadcasts for BBC World Service and Independent Radio in London. He was presented with the Coventry Cross of Nails in 1999, an award for his reconciliation efforts.

Price has over 40 years experience of reconciliation, beginning in Northern Ireland but including Latin America, Africa and the Middle East. In 2011 he was able to revisit friends in El Salvador, including one bishop, Medardo Gomez, who he was instrumental in saving from execution in a visit to the country, in 1988, during the civil war. While in the House of Lords, he used his influence to pressure politicians to find alternative and non-militarised solutions to some of the world's conflicts. In his final appearance in the House of Lords he urged G8 leaders to seize a "rare opportunity" for hope in resolving differences on Syria.

Price is the current bishop protector of the Anglican Pacifist Fellowship.

Styles
 Peter Price Esq (1944–1975)
 The Revd Peter Price (1975–1988)
 The Revd Canon Peter Price (1988–1997)
 The Rt Revd Peter Price (1997–present)

References

1944 births
Living people
Bishops of Kingston
Bishops of Bath and Wells
20th-century Church of England bishops
21st-century Church of England bishops
Alumni of Oak Hill College
Anglican pacifists